Néstor Meza (1913–1993) was a Chilean historian who received the National Prize for History in 1980.

20th-century Chilean historians
20th-century Chilean male writers
1913 births
1993 deaths
University of Chile alumni